82 Armoured Regiment is an armoured regiment of the Indian Army.

History
The regiment was raised on 1 October 1975. The first commandant was Lieutenant Colonel (later Lieutenant General) Moti Dar of the Poona Horse. It has an all-India, all-class composition, drawing troops from various castes and religions.

Lieutenant General JS Sandhu is the current Colonel of the Regiment.

Gallantry awards and honours
The regiment has won the following gallantry awards – 
Shaurya Chakra - 03 
Major Ganesh Madappa – awarded posthumously for his bravery, while in service with the 36 RR battalion at Budgam district of Jammu and Kashmir, during counter-insurgency operations.
Sowar Kalu Ram Jat
One more SC awardee  for service in CI/ CT ops.
Sena Medal (Gallantry) - 3
COAS Commendation Cards – 1
Lieutenant Colonel Arjun Ram Singh
 VCOAS Commendation Card – 1
 Risaldar Major (Honorary Captain) Amar Singh was appointed Honorary Life Aide-de-camp to the President of India on 5 April 1980.

Regimental Insignia
The cap badge of the regiment consists of a winged lion and a scroll at the base with the Regimental Motto in Devanagari script.

References
	

Armoured and cavalry regiments of the Indian Army from 1947
Military units and formations established in 1975